Viktor Mitev (born 15 February 1992) is a Bulgarian footballer who plays as a left winger for Spartak Varna.

Career
A product of the Cherno More youth academy, Mitev made his first team début in a 1–1 A PFG draw at Minyor Pernik on 21 May 2011, coming on as a substitute for Vladimir Kaptiev.

References

External links
 Stats Centre: Viktor Mitev Facts at Guardian.co.uk
 

1992 births
Living people
Bulgarian footballers
Association football midfielders
PFC Cherno More Varna players
PFC Kaliakra Kavarna players
PFC Spartak Varna players
FC Lyubimets players
FC Chernomorets Balchik players
FC Lokomotiv Gorna Oryahovitsa players
First Professional Football League (Bulgaria) players
Second Professional Football League (Bulgaria) players